The 2018 World Enduro Championship is the 29th season of the FIM World Enduro Championship. The season consists of eight events.

The series returns to the three class structure that it previously held in 2016. The Enduro 1, Enduro 2 and Enduro 3 classes will return, with the EnduroGP being an overall standing across all three classes.

For the first time in the history of the series, a 'hard enduro' event will be on the calendar. 'The Wall' hard enduro event in Italy will act as the fifth round of the series.
Steve Holcombe goes into the championship after winning the EnduroGP class in 2017. Josep Garcia is the reigning champion from Enduro 2.

Calendar
An eight-round calendar was announced.

EnduroGP

Riders Championship

Enduro 1

Entry List

Riders Championship

Enduro 2

Entry List

Riders Championship

Enduro 3

Entry List

Riders Championship

Junior

Calendar

Riders Championship

Junior 1

Entry List

Riders Championship

Junior 2

Entry List

Riders Championship

Youth

Calendar

Entry List

Riders Championship

Women

Calendar

Entry List

Riders Championship

References 

FIM Enduro